is a sequel to the Japanese anime television series Jungle Emperor, or Kimba the White Lion. Osamu Tezuka had always wanted his story of Kimba to follow Kimba's entire life, and the Jungle Emperor/Kimba series was such a hit in Japan that Tezuka produced a sequel, without his American partners, in 1966. An English dub of the series was first broadcast in the United States in 1984 on the CBN Cable Network (now Freeform).
	
Making the series without a co-producer gave him complete creative control. For example, Tezuka changed the conclusion of his original manga story (represented in the last two episodes of this series) to a happy ending.
 	
Leo the Lion does not follow immediately from the end of the Kimba series. Instead, the story begins a couple of years following the end of the previous series. To English-speaking audiences, the behavior of the title character is inexplicably out of line with what was established in the first series. At the end of the first series, in the original Japanese script, Kimba promises to keep his animals separate from humans. It is this promise that drives the seemingly hermit-like Leo in this series.
	
As the series unfolds, the focus shifts from the title character to one of his cubs, the male named Rune. This series as a whole is about Rune's growth, from a whining weakling to a confident leader.

This Japanese series (so named because Leo was the Japanese name for the Kimba character) was dubbed into English by a company based in Miami, Florida in the United States known as SONIC-Sound International Corporation, and run by Enzo Caputo. The theme song for the English dub was written by Mark Boccaccio and Susan Brunet.

Stuart Chapin, who dubbed many of the voices into English, "colloquialized" all 26 scripts.  After Chapin and Caputo clashed about basic matters (Chapin wanted the series to reference Kimba, a show Caputo never heard of; Chapin also wanted the Thompson gazelle to be called "Tommy" but Caputo stuck with "Tumy" because that was how the Japanese spelled it), Chapin ignored most of the plots and made up the scripts as he pleased, matching the dialog to lip movements.  Thus, an elephant quotes a poem by Emily Dickinson and a gadget-heavy spy episode becomes a vehicle for "Sterling Bond", James Bond's hapless brother.  In later scripts, puns abounded.  In the last script, Chapin had Leo/Kimba (voiced by Caputo himself) explain the Kimba name mix-up.

Characters 

While there is a common misconception that Leo's cub Rune is Leo himself, Leo is actually grown up to a fully adult lion with white fur. Unlike the previous series, the producers of the English-dubbed version of this series used the original Japanese names for nearly all the characters:

Leo
Lea
LoLo
Coco
Mandy
Rune and Rukio
Squawk
Tommy
Rick The Lycon
Grandpa Leopard
Mr. Hunter
Rhino
Agura the Terrible One
Bizo
Pagoola
The Saber-Toothed Tiger
Triceratops Herd
Huge The Gorilla
Zamba the Blue Lion
The Ceratosaurus
The Mahamba
Raffe
Dr. Sugi
Christopher Sugi

Voice cast

Original Japanese voices (1966)
Takashi Toyama – Leo
Haruko Kitahama – Lea
Eiko Masuyama – Rukio
Kyoko Satomi – Rune
Gorō Naya – Purasu
Junji Chiba – Higeoyaji
Mayo Suzukaze – Guest
Tōru Ōhira – Ronmel

English dubbing voices (1984)
Enzo Caputo – Leo
Jose Alvarez – Rune
Stuart Chapin – Parrot, Panther, Rhino, others

Others in the English dubbing voice cast for this anime are not available at present for listing.

References

External links

1966 anime television series debuts
1967 Japanese television series endings
Japanese children's animated action television series
Japanese children's animated adventure television series
Anime series based on manga
Animated television series about lions
Fuji TV original programming
Jungle Emperor Leo
Mushi Production
Osamu Tezuka anime
Osamu Tezuka characters
Sequel television series
Television shows set in Africa